The Faulknor family was an English family from Northamptonshire, of which several generations served as officers in the Royal Navy.

William Faulknor
William Faulknor (d. 25 February 1725) first appears as fourth lieutenant of the Royal William in 1695. On 17 March 1707, he was promoted to the rank of captain, and given command of the 80-gun ship of the line . He afterwards commanded a frigate, and in 1715 was appointed to command of the 80-gun , flagship of Admiral Sir John Norris, commander of the Baltic fleet. In 1720 he commanded the 90-gun ship . In 1722 he was, for a short time, Master Attendant of Woolwich Dockyard, then served as Lieutenant-Governor of Greenwich Hospital until his death on 25 February 1725 (N.S.)

Samuel Faulknor (I)
Samuel Faulknor (d. 5 October 1744) was the son of William Faulknor. On 28 July 1744 Victory sailed with a fleet of British and Dutch ships from St. Helen's for Lisbon. During the voyage they captured six French ships. On 3 October the fleet was dispersed in a gale, and on the next night Victory was lost with her entire crew. It was believed that Victory struck the Casquets rocks off Alderney, but in 2009 a wreck identified as Victory was found by Odyssey Marine Exploration nearly 62 miles from where the ship was supposed to have sunk.

Samuel Faulknor (II)
Samuel Faulknor (d. 28 May 1760) was the son of Samuel Faulknor. He distinguished himself as the commander of the sloop  in 1746, and was afterwards made post. On 21 April 1746, Faulknor was appointed to the 20-gun frigate , and afterwards the frigate , in which he sailed to Jamaica. During a hurricane on 11 September 1751, the Fox was lost, but Faulknor, and the greater part of his crew were saved. He returned to England in mid-1752, and was first appointed to the 20-gun ship , and then to the Lyne, also of 20 guns, in early 1755. Within months he took command of the 60-gun , and distinguished himself on various occasions, particularly on 17 April 1758, when he chased two French frigates, and three storeships, until he captured the Grand St. Pierre; and on 27 March 1759, off Lisbon, he attacked four large French ships, and took the East Indiaman Duc de Chartres. He died on 28 May 1760.

Robert Faulknor the elder
Robert Faulknor the elder (d. 9 May 1769) was also the son of Samuel Faulknor. Robert entered the Navy while still a boy, and in 1741, aged only 15, served during the siege of Carthagena. He was seriously wounded there—sixteen splinters of bone were taken from his ankle—but was promoted to lieutenant soon afterwards. He later served in the Battle of Minorca on 20 May 1756, and was a witness at Admiral Byng's subsequent court-martial. Soon after Faulknor was promoted to the rank of commander in a sloop-of-war, and in 1757, was advanced to post-rank, and commanded the 68-gun ship Marlborough, for a short time. In August 1761 Faulknor was in command of the seventy-four , and sailing in company with the frigate  (36) off Vigo, northern Spain, when they engaged the French seventy-four , and the 36-gun frigates Malicicuse and Ermine. Bellona fought and captured Courageux in a fierce action lasting just 55 minutes, while Brilliant engaged the frigates. In poor health after a fall from a horse whilst hunting, he then lived in Bath, and afterwards in Dijon, central France, where he died on 9 May 1769.

Jonathan Faulknor the elder

Jonathan Faulknor (d. 24 June 1795) was another son of Samuel Faulknor. He was promoted to lieutenant on 24 August 1753, and to commander on 28 September 1758, and commanded the bomb ketch , under Commodore Keppel, in the Gorée expedition. On 9 July 1759, he appears as captain of the 20-gun ship  in the West Indies. In 1767 he was appointed to command of the 74-gun ship , flagship of Rear-Admiral Sir John Moore. Faulknor was next appointed to the 74-gun  in 1777; and in 1778 sailed under the flag of Admiral Keppel, as second captain of the 104-gun . In 1782 he was appointed to the 98-gun , and sailed with Lord Howe's fleet to the relief of Gibraltar. He afterwards continued in the Princess Royal as a guardship at Portsmouth; and was appointed to the 74-gun  on the same service. Faulknor was promoted to the rank of rear-admiral of the white on 24 September 1787; rear-admiral of the red on 21 September 1790; vice-admiral of the blue, 1 February 1793; vice of the white, 12 April 1794; vice of the red, 12 July 1794; and finally admiral of the blue on 1 June 1795. On receiving his last promotion, he travelled to London from his home in Havant to be presented to the King. On the morning of 23 June 1795 he was struck with a fit of apoplexy, and died the next day.

Robert Faulknor the younger

Robert Faulknor the younger (1763–1795) was the son of Robert Faulknor the elder. He entered the Navy in 1777 and served under William Cornwallis in several ships during the American War, receiving promotion to lieutenant in 1780. After several periods on half-pay he was appointed commander of the 16-gun sloop  on the outbreak of the French Revolutionary War in 1793. After an attack on Fort Royal, Martinique, Faulknor was made post and given command of the 28-gun frigate . He then took part in the invasion of Guadeloupe. Faulknor was in command of the frigate  when she captured the French frigate  on 6 January 1795. Faulknor was killed during the action.

Jonathan Faulknor the younger
Jonathan Faulknor the younger was the son of Jonathan Faulknor the elder. In 1789 he married Rebecca, daughter of Lieutenant-General Horatio Spry (1730–1811) of the Cornish Spry family. He died in 1809 with the rank of rear-admiral of the red. He was the father of Commander Jonathan Faulknor, R.N., and Lieutenant Augustus Spry Faulknor, and the grandfather of Colonel Jonathan Augustus Spry Faulknor.

Family tree

References

Royal Navy officers
English families
People from Northamptonshire